Simon Bucher (born 23 May 2000) is an Austrian swimmer. He competed in the 2020 Summer Olympics in the 100m butterfly event, but did not advance from the preliminary round.

References

2000 births
Living people
Sportspeople from Linz
Swimmers at the 2020 Summer Olympics
Austrian male butterfly swimmers
Olympic swimmers of Austria
21st-century Austrian people
European Aquatics Championships medalists in swimming